The Papuan parrotfinch (Erythrura papuana) is a common species of estrildid finch found in New Guinea. It has an estimated global extent of occurrence of 50,000 to 100,000 km2. There is some doubt as to whether this species and the blue-faced parrotfinch (E. trichroa) are conspecific.

It is found in subtropical and tropical montane moist forest. The IUCN has classified the species as being of least concern.

References

External links
Species factsheet - BirdLife International

Papuan parrotfinch
Birds of New Guinea
Birds described in 1900